Lost Kisses may refer to:
 Lost Kisses (2010 film), an Italian comedy-drama film
 Lost Kisses (1945 film), an Argentine film